"This Feeling" is a song by the German-based IYES and South African-born Australian dance remixer/producer Ryan Riback. Originally intended to be solely an IYES only single, Riback liked the track and collaborated on a newly re-recorded version of the song.

The track became the first number-one single for both artists in the United States on Billboard's Dance Club Songs chart, reaching the summit in its 9 March 2019 issue.

Track listing

Original
Digital download
 "This Feeling" – 3:18  
 "This Feeling" (Extended Mix) – 4:15

Remixes (Part 1)
Digital download
 "This Feeling" (Teo Mandrelli Remix)
 "This Feeling" (Jared Martson Remix Radio Edit)
 "This Feeling" (MC4D Remix)
 "This Feeling" (PANNY Remix)
 "This Feeling" (Jared Martson Remix)
 "This Feeling" (MC4D Remix Extended)

Remixes (Part 2)
Digital download
 "This Feeling" (StoneBridge & Damien Hall Epic Mix)
 "This Feeling" (StoneBridge & Damien Hall Epic Extended Mix)
 "This Feeling" (StoneBridge & Damien Hall Epic Extended Mix Instrumental)

Charts

Weekly charts

Year-end charts

References

External links
Official video at YouTube

2018 songs
2018 singles